Together is the second studio album by Italian girl group Lollipop, released on January 23, 2004 via WEA Records / Warner Music Italy. The album was more mature than the previous Popstars but it was released by WEA without any promotion on radio or TV and, as a result of this decision, it didn't even peak at #75 in the Italian album chart. It spawned two singles: "Dreaming Of Love" (#50) and "You" (digital release only).
Each girl sings a solo song on this album and Dominique and Roberta wrote their own songs.
After the flop of this album the record label decided to drop them and the group eventually disbanded.

Track listing

Charts
Album 

Singles

2004 albums
Lollipop (Italian band) albums